was an observation and radio tower built beside the headquarters of Asahi Broadcasting Corporation (ABC) in Kita-ku, Osaka, Japan. It also relayed radio communication the taxi companies.

Form 
Below this, the tower was painted in white and above it in red and white.

Function 
The tower cost 400 million yen and construction was finished in 1966. It had an elevator that could carry 30 persons up to the observation deck, which in turn, could accommodate 270 persons. 4,000 visitors attended the inauguration. In 1979, the "Sky Studio" was installed on the second floor of the observation deck, broadcasting a morning show with weather, traffic conditions, etc. The observation deck was closed to the public in 1997 after heightened security measures due to, among other things, the mail bomb incident of 1994. In 2008, the tower was scheduled to be removed, when the headquarters of ABC moved to Fukushima-ku, Osaka. It was finally demolished in 2009.

References

External links 

 Asahi Broadcasting Corporation sign-on sequence, 1967–1989, features the tower
 Sign-on and sign-off sequence from 1992

Communication towers in Japan
Observation towers in Japan
Tourist attractions in Osaka
Buildings and structures in Osaka
Towers completed in 1966
1966 establishments in Japan
2009 disestablishments in Japan
Buildings and structures demolished in 2009
Kita-ku, Osaka